Drábské světničky is a ruin of a 13th-century rock castle in the Czech Republic. The castle covers a group of seven sandstone rocks, connected with wooden bridges. It has been abandoned since the Hussite wars in the 15th century.

Castles in the Czech Republic
Populated places in Mladá Boleslav District
Castles in the Central Bohemian Region
Tourist attractions in the Central Bohemian Region
Climbing areas of the Czech Republic